Saphenista novaelimae is a species of moth of the family Tortricidae. It is found in Nova Lima, Brazil.

The wingspan is about 12 mm. The ground colour of the forewings is cream, but more white along the edges of the markings. The suffusions are pale ochreous and the costal strigulae (fine streaks) and spots are brownish. The hindwings are greyish brown.

Etymology
The species name refers to the type locality, Nova Lima.

References

Moths described in 2007
Saphenista